The affine symmetric groups are a family of mathematical structures that describe the symmetries of the number line and the regular triangular tiling of the plane, as well as related higher-dimensional objects. Each one is an infinite extension of a finite symmetric group, the group of permutations (rearrangements) of a finite set. In addition to their geometric description, the affine symmetric groups may be defined as collections of permutations of the integers (..., −2, −1, 0, 1, 2, ...) that are periodic in a certain sense, or in purely algebraic terms as a group with certain generators and relations. They are studied as part of the fields of combinatorics and representation theory.

Many important combinatorial properties of the finite symmetric groups can be extended to affine symmetric groups.  Permutation statistics such as descents and inversions can be defined in the affine case.  As in the finite case, the natural combinatorial definitions for these statistics also have a geometric interpretation.

The affine symmetric groups have close relationships with other mathematical objects, including juggling patterns and certain complex reflection groups. Many of their combinatorial and geometric properties extend to the broader family of affine Coxeter groups.

Definitions
The affine symmetric group may be equivalently defined as an abstract group by generators and relations, or in terms of concrete geometric and combinatorial models.

Algebraic definition 

One way of defining groups is by generators and relations. In this type of definition, generators are a subset of group elements that, when combined, produce all other elements. The relations of the definition are a system of equations satisfied by those elements that imply all of the other equations they satisfy. In this way, the affine symmetric group  is generated by a set

of  elements that satisfy the following relations: when ,
  (the generators are involutions),
 .
In the relations above, indices are taken modulo , so that the third relation includes as a particular case . (The second and third relation are sometimes called the braid relations.)
When , the affine symmetric group  is the infinite dihedral group generated by two elements  subject only to the relations .

In these diagrams, the vertices represent the generators, which for Coxeter groups must be involutions. The edges of the cycle correspond to the relations between pairs of consecutive generators, while the absence of an edge between other pairs of generators indicates that they commute.

Geometric definition 

In the Euclidean space  with coordinates , the set  of points for which  forms a (hyper)plane, an -dimensional subspace.

Inside , the subset of points with integer coordinates forms the root lattice, . It is the set of all the integer vectors  such that . Each reflection preserves this lattice, and so the lattice is preserved by the whole group.

The fixed subspaces of these reflections divide  into congruent simplices, called alcoves. The situation when  is shown in the figure; in this case, the root lattice is a triangular lattice, with reflecting lines dividing it into equilateral triangle alcoves. However for higher dimensions, the alcoves are not regular simplices.

To translate between the geometric and algebraic definitions, one fixes an alcove and consider the  hyperplanes that form its boundary. The reflections through these boundary hyperplanes may be identified with the Coxeter generators. For , one may identify the reflection through  with the Coxeter generator , and also identify the reflection through  with the generator .

Combinatorial definition 
The elements of the affine symmetric group may be realized as a group of periodic permutations of the integers. In particular, say that a function  is an affine permutation if
 for all integers  (the function is equivariant under shifting by ), and
, the th triangular number.
For every affine permutation, and more generally every shift-equivariant bijection, the numbers  must all be distinct modulo . An affine permutation is uniquely determined by its window notation , because all other values of  can be found by shifting these values.

To translate between the combinatorial and algebraic definitions, for  one may identify the Coxeter generator  with the affine permutation that has window notation , and also identify the generator  with the affine permutation .

Representation as matrices 

Affine permutations can be represented as infinite periodic permutation matrices. If  is an affine permutation, the corresponding matrix has entry 1 at position  in the infinite grid  for each integer , and all other entries are equal to 0. Since  is a bijection, the resulting matrix contains exactly one 1 in every row and column. The periodicity condition on the map  ensures that the entry at position  is equal to the entry at position  for every pair of integers . For example, a portion of the matrix for the affine permutation  is shown in the figure.

Relationship to the finite symmetric group 
The affine symmetric group  contains the finite symmetric group  of permutations on  elements as both a subgroup and a quotient group.

As a subgroup 
There is a canonical way to choose a subgroup of  that is isomorphic to the finite symmetric group .

As a quotient 

There is a simple map (technically, a surjective group homomorphism)  from  onto the finite symmetric group .

The window notations of such affine permutations are of the form , where  is an integer vector such that , that is, where . Geometrically, this kernel consists of the translations, the isometries that shift the entire space  without rotating or reflecting it.

Connection between the geometric and combinatorial definitions 

The affine symmetric group  has  as a normal subgroup, and is isomorphic to the semidirect product

Consequently, every element  of  has a unique realization as a product 

This point of view allows for a direct translation between the combinatorial and geometric definitions of : if one writes  where  and  then the affine permutation  corresponds to the rigid motion of  defined by

Furthermore, as with every affine Coxeter group, the affine symmetric group acts transitively and freely on the set of alcoves: for each two alcoves, a unique group element takes one alcove to the other.

Example:  

Algebraically,  is the infinite dihedral group, generated by two generators  subject to the relations .

Combinatorially, the affine permutation  has window notation , corresponding to the bijection  for every integer . The affine permutation  has window notation , corresponding to the bijection  for every integer . Other elements have the following window notations:
 
 
 
 

Geometrically, the space  on which  acts is a line, with infinitely many equally spaced reflections.

Permutation statistics and permutation patterns
Many permutation statistics and other features of the combinatorics of finite permutations can be extended to the affine case.

Descents, length, and inversions
Combinatorially, the length of an affine permutation is encoded in terms of an appropriate notion of inversions: for an affine permutation , the length is

Alternatively, it is the number of equivalence classes of pairs  such that  and  under the equivalence relation  if  for some integer .

Similarly, there is an affine analogue of descents in permutations: an affine permutation  has a descent in position  if . (By periodicity,  has a descent in position  if and only if it has a descent in position  for all integers .)
Algebraically, the descents corresponds to the right descents in the sense of Coxeter groups; that is,  is a descent of  if and only if . The left descents (that is, those indices  such that  are the descents of the inverse affine permutation ; equivalently, they are the values  such that  occurs before  in the sequence .
Geometrically,  is a descent of  if and only if the fixed hyperplane of  separates the alcoves  and 

Because there are only finitely many possibilities for the number of descents of an affine permutation, but infinitely many affine permutations, it is not possible to naively form a generating function for affine permutations by number of descents (an affine analogue of Eulerian polynomials). One possible resolution is to consider affine descents (equivalently, cyclic descents) in the finite symmetric group . Another is to consider simultaneously the length and number of descents of an affine permutation. The generating function for these statistics over  simultaneously for all  is

Cycle type and reflection length 

Any bijection  partitions the integers into a (possibly infinite) list of (possibly infinite) cycles: for each integer , the cycle containing  is the sequence  where exponentiation represents functional composition. 

Fully commutative elements and pattern avoidance
A reduced word for an element  of a Coxeter group is a tuple  of Coxeter generators of minimum possible length such that . The element  is called fully commutative if any reduced word can be transformed into any other by sequentially swapping pairs of factors that commute. For example, in the finite symmetric group , the element  is fully commutative, since its two reduced words  and  can be connected by swapping commuting factors, but  is not fully commutative because there is no way to reach the reduced word  starting from the reduced word  by commutations.

 proved that in the finite symmetric group , a permutation is fully commutative if and only if it avoids the permutation pattern 321, that is, if and only if its one-line notation contains no three-term decreasing subsequence. In , this result was extended to affine permutations: an affine permutation  is fully commutative if and only if there do not exist integers  such that .

The number of affine permutations avoiding a single pattern  is finite if and only if  avoids the pattern 321, so in particular there are infinitely many fully commutative affine permutations.

Parabolic subgroups and other structures
Other aspects of the affine symmetric group, such as its Bruhat order and representation theory, may also be understood via combinatorial models.

Parabolic subgroups, coset representatives

A standard parabolic subgroup of a Coxeter group is a subgroup generated by a subset of its Coxeter generating set. The maximal parabolic subgroups are those that come from omitting a single Coxeter generator. In , all maximal parabolic subgroups are isomorphic to the finite symmetric group . The subgroup generated by the subset  consists of those affine permutations that stabilize the interval , that is, that map every element of this interval to another element of the interval.

Every coset  has a unique element of minimum length. The collection of such representatives, denoted , consists of the following affine permutations:

In the particular case that , so that  is the standard copy of  inside , the elements of  may naturally be represented by abacus diagrams: the integers are arranged in an infinite strip of width , increasing sequentially along rows and then from top to bottom; integers are circled if they lie directly above one of the window entries of the minimal coset representative. For example, the minimal coset representative  is represented by the abacus diagram at right. To compute the length of the representative from the abacus diagram, one adds up the number of uncircled numbers that are smaller than the last circled entry in each column. (In the example shown, this gives .)

Other combinatorial models of minimum-length coset representatives for  can be given in terms of core partitions (integer partitions in which no hook length is divisible by ) or bounded partitions (integer partitions in which no part is larger than ).

Bruhat order
The Bruhat order on  has the following combinatorial realization.

Representation theory and an affine Robinson–Schensted correspondence 
In the finite symmetric group, the Robinson–Schensted correspondence gives a bijection between the group and pairs  of standard Young tableaux of the same shape. This bijection plays a central role in the combinatorics and the representation theory of the symmetric group. For example, in the language of Kazhdan–Lusztig theory, two permutations lie in the same left cell if and only if their images under Robinson–Schensted have the same tableau , and in the same right cell if and only if their images have the same tableau .

Inverse realizations

We describe these alternate realizations now.

From this perspective, a reduced word corresponds to an alcove walk on the tessellated space .

Relationship to other mathematical objects 
The affine symmetric group is closely related to a variety of other mathematical objects.

Juggling patterns 

In , a correspondence is given between affine permutations and juggling patterns encoded in a version of siteswap notation. Here, a juggling pattern of period  is a sequence  of nonnegative integers (with certain restrictions) that captures the behavior of balls thrown by a juggler, where the number  indicates the length of time the th throw spends in the air (equivalently, the height of the throw). The number  of balls in the pattern is the average . The Ehrenborg–Readdy correspondence associates to each juggling pattern  of period  the function  defined by

where indices of the sequence a are taken modulo . Under this bijection, the length of the affine permutation is encoded by a natural statistic in the juggling pattern:

where  is the number of crossings (up to periodicity) in the arc diagram of a. This allows an elementary proof of the generating function for affine permutations by length.

Therefore, it corresponds to the affine permutation . The juggling pattern has four crossings, and the affine permutation has length .

Complex reflection groups 
In a finite-dimensional real inner product space, a reflection is a linear transformation that fixes a linear hyperplane pointwise and negates the vector orthogonal to the plane. This notion may be extended to vector spaces over other fields. In particular, in a complex inner product space, a reflection is a unitary transformation  of finite order that fixes a hyperplane. A complex reflection group is a finite group of linear transformations on a complex vector space generated by reflections.

The group  is the generalized symmetric group: algebraically, it is the wreath product  of the cyclic group  with the symmetric group . Concretely, the elements of the group may be represented by monomial matrices (matrices having one nonzero entry in every row and column) whose nonzero entries are all th roots of unity.

Affine Lie algebras 
Each affine Coxeter group is associated to an affine Lie algebra, a certain infinite-dimensional non-associative algebra with unusually nice representation-theoretic properties. In this association, the Coxeter group arises as a group of symmetries of the root space of the Lie algebra (the dual of the Cartan subalgebra).

Like other Kac–Moody algebras, affine Lie algebras satisfy the Weyl–Kac character formula, which expresses the characters of the algebra in terms of their highest weights. In the case of affine Lie algebras, the resulting identities are equivalent to the Macdonald identities. In particular, for the affine Lie algebra of type , associated to the affine symmetric group , the corresponding Macdonald identity is equivalent to the Jacobi triple product.

Extended affine symmetric group 
The affine symmetric group is a subgroup of the extended affine symmetric group. The extended group is isomorphic to the wreath product . Its elements are extended affine permutations: bijections  such that  for all integers . Unlike the affine symmetric group, the extended affine symmetric group is not a Coxeter group. But it has a natural generating set that extends the Coxeter generating set for : the shift operator  whose window notation is  generates the extended group with the simple reflections, subject to the additional relations .

Combinatorics of other affine Coxeter groups 
The geometric action of the affine symmetric group  places it naturally in the family of affine Coxeter groups, each of which has a similar geometric action on an affine space. Thus, the combinatorial interpretations of descents, inversions, etc., carry over in these cases. Abacus models of minimum-length coset representatives for parabolic quotients have also been extended to this context.

History
The study of Coxeter groups in general could be said to first arise in the classification of regular polyhedra (the Platonic solids) in ancient Greece. The modern systematic study (connecting the algebraic and geometric definitions of finite and affine Coxeter groups) began in work of Coxeter in the 1930s.

References

Notes

Works cited 
 
 
 
 
 
 
 
 
 
 
 
 
 
 
 
 
 
 
 
 
 
 
  
 
 
 
 
 
 
 
 
 
 
 
 
 
 

Coxeter groups
Reflection groups
Permutation groups
Symmetry
Representation theory